Frédéric Le Junter (born in Dunkirk in 1956) is a French experimental musical instrument builder, as well as a performance and installation artist. He is using self-made instruments and mechanical machines. He has already built 150 musical machines. He created similar machines for light and visual installations. He has also build external installations powered by water or wind to create sounds and music. He recorded five studio albums, two in collaboration with Pierre Berthet and one with Dominique Répécaud. He also recorded songs with Pierre Bastien.

Visual installations

 Zone translucide at Maison Salvan, 2009

Sound installations

 2015 Avec le vent, sound installation at Mons 2015 European Capital of Culture
 2014 Jardin composite, sound installation at the 30th Festival Musique Action, Vandœuvre-lès-Nancy

Discography

 Bateau feu, 2017
 Chansons impopulaires, 2005

With Pierre Berthet

 L'Enclume des jours, 2011
 Berthet - Le Junter, 1994

With Dominique Répécaud
 Les Massifs de fleurs - T’es pas drône, 2015

References

External links
 About Frédéric Le Junter on France Musique
 Frédéric Le Junter's Website
 Video portrait on LaTéléLibre
 Video portrait on Arte

1956 births
Living people
French musicians
Inventors of musical instruments